Kemani Kane Duggan (born 9 May 2001), known professionally as Bandokay (formerly stylized as BandoKay), is a British rapper. He is a member of the UK drill group OFB.

Beginning his career in 2018 alongside fellow OFB rappers SJ and Double Lz, Bandokay gained prominence in 2019 after release of Frontstreet. The mixtape peaked at number 36 on the UK Albums Chart and was followed by Drill Commandmants, released in 2021.

Early life 
Kemani Kane Duggan was born on 9 May 2001, in Tottenham, London, England. He is the son of Mark Duggan, who was shot to death by police in 2011. After his father's death, Duggan was looked after by Marcus Knox-Hooke, one of his father's friends. This would lead Knox-Hooke to form a program to look after vulnerable youth in Tottenham.

Sometime afterwards, Duggan began secondary school; however, he would be kicked out three months after beginning due to his inability to control his behaviour.

Career

2018-19: Early career and Frontstreet

In a 2022 video showcasing his daily life, Bandokay stated that Kash, a member of OFB, was the main reason that he would take a career in music seriously; according to Bandokay, Kash would call him in order to write lyrics.

Bandokay began his musical career in early 2018 with the release of "Bruck It" alongside Kash, Ys, Double Lz and Boogie B. In late 2018, he released "Bad B on the Nizz" alongside Double Lz and SJ; according to an interview with Complex Networks, the song gained one million views in a week. In the same interview, Double Lz said that the first song that he and Bandokay made was created in 2017; however, it was never released. The three would, for sometime, adopt the name Y.OFB ("Young OFB"); the "Y." prefix would later be dropped in 2019. 

On 14 November 2019, the group would release their debut mixtape Frontstreet; the mixtape would peak at number 36 on the UK Albums Chart. The mixtape also included "Ambush", which was certified silver by the British Phonographic Industry.

2019-21: Drill Commandments
Following the release of Frontstreet, Bandokay would appear on Kenny Allstar's Mad About Bars freestyle series in 2019 and release  "Lightwork Freestyle" in 2020, both of which featured Double Lz. In 2020, he would release "OT Bopping" with Double Lz, which peaked at number 91 on the UK Singles Chart.

In the beginning of 2020, Bandokay was named within the top 20 British MCs to watch in 2020 by Complex Networks.

In March of 2020, Bandokay would appear alongside Double Lz on iLL BLU's "Magic" and on "War" by Mastermind, which would peak at number 46 and number 39 on the UK Singles Chart, respectively. In May, he would release "Patient", which would peak at number 92. 

In July, Bandokay would appear on Deno's "Circles", also featuring Double Lz; the song peaked at number 36. In October, Bandokay would release "BLM" with Double Lz and Abra Cadabra, which peaked at number 63. During a 2020 interview with Vice regarding "BLM", Double Lz and Bandokay teased that another mixtape was in the works, which included features from Loski, Abra Cadabra, and others. 

The mixtape, named Drill Commandments, was released by the two on 19 March 2021; it would peak at number 53 on the UK Albums Chart.

2021-present: No Requests and solo album
In June 2021, Bandokay released "Slide"; it peaked at number 74.

In January 2022, Bandokay announced in a video that he and Double Lz were to release solo albums. He would also release "Praise the Lord" in the same month. In February, Bandokay was signed to No Requests, created by Tiffany Calver in collaboration with Polydor Records. In March, he would release "Tower Hill Freestyle", named after an area in Saint Andrew Parish, Jamaica.

Legal issues

In 2022, Bandokay, alongside Double Lz, was charged with violent disorder following a 2021 incident at a Selfridges store where two people were stabbed.

Discography

Mixtapes

Singles

As main artist

As featured artist

Guest appearances

Awards and nominations

References 

Black British male rappers
Rappers from London
English male rappers
UK drill musicians
Gangsta rappers
2001 births
Living people
People from Tottenham